The Conquest class is a class of cruise ships owned by Carnival Cruise Lines, a subdivision of the Carnival Corporation. The Conquest-class design was modified from the Destiny-class design by lengthening the ship by around 59 feet which expanded most of the facilities, added a restaurant above the lido deck and increased the number of passenger cabins. The public rooms in both classes are very similar structurally but vary in décor, with room names that match the ship's theme.

Ships

References

External links
 Carnival Cruise Lines

Cruise ship classes
Carnival Cruise Lines